Calvary Catholic Cemetery is a Catholic cemetery, in the Chicago suburb of Evanston, Illinois.

Notable burials
 James R. Buckley, US Congressman
 Jane Byrne, first female Mayor of Chicago
 Charles Comiskey, founding owner of the Chicago White Sox
 John Coughlin, 1st ward alderman from 1892 to 1938
 John Creed, Civil War Medal of Honor recipient
 Thomas Cusack, US Congressman
 William Emmett Dever, mayor of Chicago from 1923 to 1926
 Edward Fitzsimmons Dunne, Illinois Governor
 James Dunne, Civil War Medal of Honor recipient
 James Thomas Farrell, author
 John Frederick Finerty, US Congressman
 George Peter Foster, US Congressman
 John Gottselig, ice hockey player
 James H. Hallinan, MLB player
 George Peter Alexander Healy, Abraham Lincoln portrait painter
 John Patrick Hopkins, mayor of Chicago from 1893 to 1895
 Edward N. Hurley, Chairman of the Federal Trade Commission
 Edward Joseph Kelly, mayor of Chicago from 1933 to 1947
 Martin H. Kennelly, mayor of Chicago from 1947 to 1955
 Frank Lawler, US Congressman
 Elmer Layden, Hall of Fame football player
 Roland Victor Libonati, US Congressman
 William Lorimer, US Congressman and Senator
 William F. Mahoney, US Representative from 1901 to 1904
 James McAndrews, US Congressman
 Patrick McGuire, Civil War Medal of Honor recipient
 Frederic McLaughlin, First owner of Chicago Black Hawks NHL team in 1926. He named the team after his WWI army unit, the 86th Infantry "Blackhawk" Division
 Hugh Molloy, Civil War Medal of Honor recipient
 William J. Moxley, US Congressman
 James A. Mulligan, Civil War Brevet General
 Hank O'Day, MLB umpire
 Marie Owens first policewoman in Chicago, first known female police officer in America
 Emmett Paré, professional tennis player and coach
 John W. Rainey, US Representative from 1918 to 1923
 Alexander John Resa, US Congressman
 Jimmy Ryan, MLB player

 James Michael Slattery, US Senator
 Edmund J. Stack, US Congressman
 Patrick D. Tyrrell, Secret Service detective
 James Hugh Ward, US Congressman

References

Burials at Calvary Cemetery (Evanston, Illinois)
Cemeteries in Cook County, Illinois
Roman Catholic cemeteries in Illinois
1859 establishments in Illinois